The gens Cossutia was a plebeian family of equestrian rank at ancient Rome.  It never attained any importance.

Origin
It is conjectured by some from Cicero's mention of the Cossutianae tabulae, near Caesena, in Gallia Cisalpina, that the Cossutii originally came from that place.

Branches and cognomina
On coins of this gens, we find the cognomens Maridianus and Sabula, but none occur in history.

Members
 Decimus Cossutius, a Roman architect, rebuilt the temple of the Olympian Zeus at Athens, in the most magnificent Corinthian style, in 168 BC.
 Marcus Cossutius, an eques, and a man of the greatest respectability and integrity, who lived in Sicily during the administration of Verres, and defended Xeno before the latter.
 Cossutia, fiancée and perhaps the first wife of Caesar, belonged to a very wealthy equestrian family. She was betrothed to him by his parents, while he was very young, but was rejected by him in his seventeenth year, that he might marry Cornelia.
 Gaius Cossutius Maridianus, triumvir monetalis under Caesar in 44 BC.

See also
 List of Roman gentes
 Cossutianus Capito

References

 
Roman gentes